The H. Orvel Sebring House is a historic site in Sebring, Florida. It is located at 1841 Lakeview Drive. On August 14, 1989, it was added to the U.S. National Register of Historic Places.

References

External links
 Highlands County listings at National Register of Historic Places
 Highlands County listings at Florida's Office of Cultural and Historical Programs

Houses in Highlands County, Florida
Houses on the National Register of Historic Places in Florida
Mission Revival architecture in Florida
Buildings and structures in Sebring, Florida
National Register of Historic Places in Highlands County, Florida